Freddy the Pig is the central figure in a series of 26 children's books written between 1927 and 1958 by American author Walter R. Brooks and illustrated by Kurt Wiese, consisting of 25 novels and one poetry collection. The books focus on the adventures of a group of animals living on a farm in rural upstate New York. 
 
Freddy is introduced as "the smallest and cleverest" of the pigs on the Bean farm. He is initially just one of the ensemble, but he becomes the central character shortly into the series. Freddy's interests drive the books as he becomes a detective, politician, newspaper editor, magician, pilot, and other vocations or avocations. A recurring villain is the slimy but dignified Simon, who leads a gang of criminal rats. Human characters include Mr. and Mrs. Bean (who own the farm), the population of local Centerboro, and human villains.

Much of the humor in the books is derived from the self-referential way in which the author acknowledges the unreality of talking animals, unlike other children's works in which they are accepted as normal. As the series progresses, the Bean Farm animals attain national fame for their ability to talk and read, and the humans whom they encounter are taken aback at first (though only momentarily) to find themselves conversing with animals. The animals and humans do not age, although the stories reflect the social conditions at the time of writing; for example, the books published during World War II feature scrap drives and victory gardens.

History

Brooks created his animals for To and Again, published in 1927 by Alfred A. Knopf. It took some time before their personalities were fully developed, along with their ability to talk to humans when they chose, beginning with the fourth volume in 1936.  In the remainder of the series, the animals of the Bean Farm lead a highly developed life, variously operating a bank, a newspaper, the First Animal Republic, and Freddy's detective business, which follows the principles of Sherlock Holmes as Freddy knows them from his reading.

The books went out of print in the 1960s, despite their popularity in the 1940s and 1950s, but children's libraries continued to have them. In the past decade, they have been republished by The Overlook Press in response to plaintive requests from Freddy fans who treasure their combination of ingenious plots, well-drawn characters, literary allusions, and wholesome (but not cloying) moral lessons. 
The audio and film rights to the series have been sold. Audio versions of some books were made and, as of 2009, others are apparently in preparation.

Reception of books
Adam Hochschild describes the series in The New York Times Book Review as "the moral center of my childhood universe." He also observes that sales of the books have increased since when they were first written. Roger Sale sums it up in his history of children's literature: "If L. Frank Baum has a successor, it is Brooks."<ref>"Two Pigs", in Roger Sale, Fairy Tales and After: from Snow White to E.B. White", Harvard Univ. Press, 1978, p. 245. .</ref> Columnist Nicholas Kristof named them among the best children's books ever and called them "funny, beautifully written gems."

Location of books
Nearly all the books focus on the Bean farm and Centerboro area, in Oneida County, upstate New York. Centerboro does not actually exist, nor do the other towns mentioned as being nearest (Aeschylus Center, Gomorrah Falls, South Pharisee, Plutarch Mills, and West Ninevah). However, other towns do exist, described as slightly farther away: Syracuse, Rome, Buffalo, and Utica, New York (mentioned, for example, in Freddy and the Baseball Team From Mars). This would put Centerboro somewhere east of Syracuse, close to where Brooks lived as a boy. However, in Freddy and Mr. Camphor, the nearby fictional lake Otesaraga is described as "thirty miles around, and only a mile across". This corresponds closely (and only) to Skaneateles Lake, some ten miles southwest of Syracuse. Regardless, the evidence supplied by Brooks points to the Bean farm being loosely within 30 miles southwest or generally east of Syracuse.

Illustrations
The series is illustrated by Kurt Wiese, who became an award-winning illustrator and author (although not for the Freddy series). The first book was originally illustrated by Adolfo Best Maugard but redone by Wiese when the book was re-released. After the first books, the pattern of illustration was established: a half-page black and white drawing at the beginning of each chapter, and a full page black-and-white drawing within each chapter. The covers are line drawings colored with watercolor, each emphasizing a dominant color. The endpapers are two-tone illustrations, loosely matching the cover's color theme. For example, the yellow background and blue drawing of the endpapers for Freddy Rides Again match the yellow and blue colors of the cover (Freddy, a horse, and a goat are yellow). Wiese drew more than 900 illustrations for the series.

Freddy books in order of publication
These are all 26 titles in the Freddy the Pig series. Five were originally published with other titles, in parentheses.

 Freddy Goes to Florida, 1927 (To and Again), ; re-issued as both Freddy Goes to Florida and Freddy's First Adventure in 1949
 Freddy Goes to the North Pole, 1930 (More To and Again), ; re-titled
 Freddy the Detective, 1932
 Freddy and Freginald, 1936 (The Story of Freginald); re-titled 1952
 Freddy and the Clockwork Twin, 1937 (The Clockwork Twin); re-titled 
 Freddy the Politician, 1939 (Wiggins for President); re-titled 1948
 Freddy's Cousin Weedly, 1940
 Freddy and the Ignormus, 1941
 Freddy and the Perilous Adventure, 1942
 Freddy and the Bean Home News, 1943
 Freddy and Mr. Camphor, 1944
 Freddy and the Popinjay, 1945
 Freddy the Pied Piper, 1946
 Freddy the Magician, 1947
 Freddy Goes Camping, 1948
 Freddy Plays Football, 1949
 Freddy the Cowboy, 1950
 Freddy Rides Again, 1951
 Freddy the Pilot, 1952
 Freddy and the Space Ship, 1953, 
 The Collected Poems of Freddy the Pig, 1953
 Freddy and the Men from Mars, 1954
 Freddy and the Baseball Team From Mars, 1955
 Freddy and Simon the Dictator, 1956
 Freddy and the Flying Saucer Plans, 1957
 Freddy and the Dragon'', 1958

References

Further reading

External links
 Abrams Books page for the Freddy series
 The Friends of Freddy Official website
 All about Freddy the Pig
 

Series of children's books
Fictional pigs
Children's novels about animals